Mister Mysterious is an album by pianist Mickey Tucker which was recorded in 1978 and released on the Muse label.

Reception

The Allmusic review awarded the album 3 stars.

Track listing 
All compositions by Mickey Tucker
 "Plagio" - 7:05
 "A Prayer" - 4:39
 "Mister Mysterious" - 5:00
 "Taurus Lullaby" - 7:20
 "Cecilitis" - 3:24
 "Basic Elements" - 7:05

Personnel 
Mickey Tucker - piano
Cecil Bridgewater - trumpet
Frank Foster - tenor saxophone, soprano saxophone, flute
Pepper Adams - baritone saxophone
Cecil McBee - bass
Eddie Gladden - drums
Ray Mantilla - percussion (track 1 &4)
Azzedin Weston - congas (track 4)

References 

Mickey Tucker albums
1979 albums
Muse Records albums
Albums recorded at Van Gelder Studio